The 1999–2000 San Jose Sharks season was the team's ninth season of operation in the National Hockey League (NHL). Under third-year head coach Darryl Sutter, the Sharks posted a winning record for the first time in franchise history; in doing so, they managed to clinch a playoff berth for the third consecutive season.

The Sharks' 1999–2000 regular season is remembered, in large part, for the heroics of captain Owen Nolan. Nolan, in his fourth full season with the team, posted career-best goal (44) and point (84) totals; both figures established new franchise records. Nolan's excellent play was complemented by that of fellow forwards Vincent Damphousse and Jeff Friesen; fan-favorite Mike Ricci, in his third season with the team, also turned in a quality campaign. All told, San Jose's offense improved considerably despite disappointing production from young forwards Patrick Marleau and Marco Sturm. By contrast, the Sharks' defense regressed despite quality play from starting goaltender Steve Shields, rookie goaltender Evgeni Nabokov, and defensemen Gary Suter and Brad Stuart. Still, the team finished the 1999–2000 campaign with franchise-record point (87) and win (35) totals.

The Sharks' competent play netted them the Western Conference's eighth, and final, playoff berth. In the first round, they faced the top-seeded (and heavily favored) St. Louis Blues. As expected, the Blues took the series' first game with relative ease; the Sharks shocked onlookers, however, by winning each of the next three. The Blues responded with two decisive victories of their own; in doing so, they forced a deciding seventh game in St. Louis. There, in an upset on par with their 1994 victory over the Detroit Red Wings, the Sharks scored a stunning 3–1 victory. The game is remembered, in part, for an infamous center-ice goal by Owen Nolan on Blues goaltender Roman Turek. The goal, which gave the Sharks a 2–0 lead, ultimately served as the series-winner. In the second round, the team faced the second-seeded Dallas Stars. Unlike the Blues, the defending Stanley Cup champion Stars made quick work of the Sharks; while the latter managed to steal a game in San Jose, they were ultimately eliminated in five games.

Offseason

Regular season

The Sharks had the most power-play opportunities during the regular season (377) and scored the most short-handed goals (16).

Final standings

Schedule and results

Playoffs

Player statistics

Awards and records

Transactions

Draft picks

See also
1999–2000 NHL season

References
 

San
San
San Jose Sharks seasons
San Jose Sharks
San Jose Sharks